Furni may refer to:

 Furni, Tunisia, a Roman era civitas of the Roman province of Africa Proconsularis
 Furnos Maior and Furnos Minor, ancient Roman towns and bishoprics in modern-day Tunisia

See also 
 Fourni (disambiguation)